Zain, Zayn, or as it is often anglicized Zane, is an Arabic personal name meaning "beauty, grace".

Title
Tunku Zain Al-'Abidin, (born 1982), more popularly known as Tunku 'Abidin Muhriz, is the second son of the reigning Yang di-Pertuan Besar of Negeri Sembilan in Malaysia, Tuanku Muhriz ibni Almarhum Tuanku Munawir
Zain-ul-Abidin the eighth sultan of Kashmir that reigned: 1418–1419 and 1420–1470
Zain ud-Din Ahmed Khan, also known as Mirza Muhammad Hashim, a Mughal aristocrat from Nawab of Bengal family and the father of Siraj ud-Daulah, the last independent Nawab of Bengal

Given name
Ali ibn Husayn Zayn al-Abidin (Imam, 659-713), the 4th Imam of Islam
Zain Abbas (cricketer, born 1986), a Hong Kong cricketer
Zain Abbas (cricketer, born 1991), a Pakistani cricketer
Zain Amat (born 1975), Singaporean trapshooter
Zain Asher (born 1983), British-born journalist and TV anchor
Zain Bhikha (born 1974), South African musician, singer and songwriter
Zain Al Fandi (born 1983), Syrian footballer
Zain Al Rafeea (born 2004), Syrian actor
Zain Ali Muhammad (born 2012), American football player
Zain Imam (born 1987), television actor
Zain Mahmood (died 1994), Malaysian author and screenwriter
Zain "Zayn" Malik  (born 1993), British singer and songwriter
Zain Naghmi, an American pro Super Smash Bros. Melee player
Zain Safar-ud-Din (born 1938), Malaysian cyclist
Zain Saidin (born 1984), Malaysian actor and a model
Zain Khan Sirhindi (died 1764), the Mughal Faujdar of Sirhind,
Zain Verjee (born 1974), Kenyan-born journalist and TV anchor
Zain Westbrooke (born 1996), English footballer 
Zain Wright (born 1979), Tasmania-born field hockey player

Middle name
Habeeb Zain Arif, Indian politician

Last name

Ahmed Al-Zain (born 1991), Saudi footballer
Anuar Zain (born 1970), Malaysian singer, and brother of Ziana Zain
Fred Zain (1951–2002), American forensic lab technician
Harun Al Rasyid Zain (1927–2014), Indonesian teacher, economist and bureaucrat
Maher Zain (born 1981), Swedish singer
Osama Al-Zain, Palestinian filmmaker and writer
Qari Zain (died 2009), Pakistani member of the Mehsud tribe, and a leader of a Taliban faction in South Waziristan
Ziana Zain (born 1968), Malaysian singer, model, actress, and sister of Anuar Zain

See also
Zain (disambiguation)
Zein (disambiguation)
Zayn (disambiguation)
Zain (Wazir living spin

References

Arabic unisex given names